Theresa Manzella (born November 26, 1964) is an American politician. She serves as a Republican member of the Montana Senate, representing District 44 since January 2021. From 2015 to 2021, she served in the Montana House of Representatives, representing District 85, which included parts of Hamilton, Montana.

Career 
According to her official biography, Manzella was formerly employed at Pontiac Motors headquarters and, from 1985 to 1990, as a supervisor at Electronic Data Systems; has been the owner of TNT Paints & Performance Horses since 1992, and is an employee of Willing Servants, Inc.

In the 2016 Republican Party presidential primaries, Manzella supported Ted Cruz and, after Cruz dropped out of the race, Donald Trump. Manzella ran for the Montana Senate in 2020. In the Republican primary, she faced fellow representative Nancy Ballance, with Manzella reported to be the more conservative of two candidates. Manzella won the primary and subsequently won the general election.

In the Montana Legislature, Manzella has been aligned with the right-wing faction of the state Republican Party (who called themselves "38 Specials" in reference to the bullet cartridge of that name), which has clashed with comparatively moderate Republicans (the "Solutions Caucus") who joined together with Democrats on some issues. Manzella opposed the 2018 Medicaid expansion bill in Montana, and accused Republicans who supported it of betrayal because they had joined with Democrats.

In the 2019 Montana Legislature, Manzella sponsored a bill (HB 575) that would have eliminated almost all childhood vaccine requirements for day care centers for those who claimed a religious objection. The bill, considered at a time when there was a mumps outbreak in Bozeman, Montana and a measles outbreak in neighboring Washington state, was defeated on a 32–68 vote, with a coalition of Democrats and Solutions Caucus Republicans voting no.

In a 2018 post on the Ravalli County Republicans' Facebook group, Manzella claimed that the local schoolteachers' union, MEA-MFT, was "working against our constitution and for socialism and communism." The co-president of the local union responded that Manzella's claim was false and slanderous. State Senate candidate Jason Ellsworth, a fellow Republican, also criticized Manzella's remark.

References

Living people
People from Hamilton, Montana
Women state legislators in Montana
Republican Party members of the Montana House of Representatives
Republican Party Montana state senators
21st-century American politicians
21st-century American women politicians
1964 births